Barney Live In New York City (originally titled Barney Live! At Radio City, also known as Barney & Friends: Live in New York City) is a Barney & Friends stage show, taped at Radio City Music Hall in New York City on March 6, 1994 and released on video on August 26, 1994. It was also the largest Barney & Friends stage show.

Plot
Barney and his friends take the stage to delight and entertain everyone at Radio City Music Hall. They all work together to make a special surprise for the audience using items from "The Barney Bag". But before they are able to share it, a new visitor, The Winkster, steals the bag and runs away with it. Throughout the show, the gang tries to catch The Winkster and teach him that it is important to have friends and to share. Also, the chase takes everyone to "Barney's Imagination Circus" with fun-loving clowns and some dancing bears.

Cast
 Barney (voice) - Bob West 
 Barney (costume) - David Joyner/Carey Stinson
 Baby Bop (voice) - Julie Johnson
 Baby Bop (costume) - Jeff Ayers
 B.J. (voice) - Patty Wirtz
 B.J. (costume) - Jeff Brooks
 The Winkster - David Voss/Ashley Wood
 Barney understudy - Alan Bruce
 B.J. and Baby Bop understudy - Carol Farabee
 Shawn - John David Bennett, II
 Derek - Rickey Carter
 Tosha - Hope Cervantes
 Kathy - Lauren King
 Carlos - Corey Lopez
 Min - Pia Manalo
 Julie - Susannah Wetzel
 Kelly - Rebecca Wilson
 Dancers
 Barbara Angeline
 Joe Bowerman
 Tina Bush
 Garland Days
 David DeCooman
 Vivien Eng
 Raymond Harris
 Steven Petrillo
 Carolyn Ockert
 Michelle Robinson
 Amy Shure
 Kristin Willits
 Dana Zell
 Guest - Morgan Jordan
 Narrator - Charles Edward Hall

Songs

Act One
 Barney Theme Song (Tune: Yankee Doodle)
 The More We Get Together
 Mr. Knickerbocker 
 Ring Around the Rosie
 My Yellow Blankey
 The Barney Bag
 The Winkster
 She'll Be Coming Around the Mountain
 B.J.'s Song
 Take Me Out to the Ball Game
 Rain Medley (Rain Rain Go Away and It's Raining, It's Pouring)
 If all the Raindrops
 And the Green Grass Grows All Around
 I Am a Fine Musician

Act Two
 Boom, Boom, Ain't It Great to Be Crazy?
 The Wheels On the Bus
 Three Monkeys Rap
 Do Your Ears Hang Low?
 The Airplane Song 
 Me & My Teddy
 Four Little Ducks
 My Aunt Came Back
 London Bridge Is Falling Down
 "Star" Medley (Twinkle, Twinkle, Little Star and Star Light, Star Bright)
 Please & Thank You 
 Everyone Is Special

References 

Barney & Friends
Radio City Music Hall
Mattel Creations films
1990s English-language films